The 2019 Hungarian Ladies Open was a tennis tournament played on indoor hard courts. It was the 23rd edition of the Hungarian Ladies Open and an International-level tournament on the 2019 WTA Tour.

Points and prize money

Point distribution

Prize money

Singles main draw entrants

Seeds 

 1 Rankings are as of 11 February 2019

Other entrants 
The following players received wildcards into the main draw:
  Anna Bondár
  Ana Konjuh
  Fanny Stollár

The following players received entry from the qualifying draw:
  Gréta Arn 
  Ysaline Bonaventure  
  Georgina García Pérez 
  Tereza Smitková 
  Iga Świątek 
  Natalia Vikhlyantseva

The following player received entry as a lucky loser:
  Viktoriya Tomova

Withdrawals 
Before the tournament
  Kirsten Flipkens → replaced by  Viktoriya Tomova
  Margarita Gasparyan → replaced by  Kateryna Kozlova
  Tatjana Maria → replaced by  Anna Blinkova
  Magdaléna Rybáriková → replaced by  Olga Danilović
  Anna Karolína Schmiedlová → replaced by  Fiona Ferro

Doubles main draw entrants

Seeds 

1 Rankings are as of 11 February 2019

Other entrants 
The following pairs received wildcards into the doubles main draw:
  Anna Bondár  /  Dalma Gálfi 
  Reka-Luca Jani /  Cornelia Lister

Withdrawals 
  Kirsten Flipkens (viral illness)

Champions

Singles 

  Alison Van Uytvanck def.  Markéta Vondroušová 1–6, 7–5, 6–2

Doubles 

  Ekaterina Alexandrova /  Vera Zvonareva def.  Fanny Stollár /  Heather Watson, 6–4, 4–6, [10–7]

References

External links 
 

Hungarian Ladies Open
Hungarian Ladies Open
Lad
Hungarian Ladies Open
Buda